Justin Louis Raisen is an American record producer, songwriter, audio engineer, mixing engineer, and multi-instrumentalist. His production, songwriting, and mixing credits include: Yves Tumor, David Bowie, Kim Gordon, Ariel Pink, Angel Olsen, Sky Ferreira, Sharon Van Etten, Charli XCX, Santigold, Lizzo, Joji, Lawrence Rothman, Marissa Nadler, Kills Birds, Empress Of, Miya Folick, Grace Ives, Sunflower Bean, Hazel English, Overcoats, L Devine, Kylie Minogue, Ghost, Viagra Boys, Theophilus London, Health, Ex Cops, Michael Stipe, Rain Phoenix and Billy Corgan.

Life and career 
Raisen, a native of Massapequa, New York, now resides in Los Angeles where he owns a recording studio.

Productions 
Raisen's credits indicate his frequent use of live musicians in his productions. His collaborators include Pino Paladino, Jim Keltner, Joey Warnoker, Carla Azar, Patty Schemel, Jenny Lee, Justin Meldal-Johnson, Gus Seyffert, Roger Manning Jr., Victor Indrizzo, Stella Mozgawa, Nick Zinner, Henry Schiff, Stewart Bronaugh, Joe Kennedy, Eva Gardner, Dennis Hamm, & Duff McKagan.

Controversy 
After the Lizzo single "Truth Hurts" reached number one on the Billboard Hot 100 in 2019, Raisen, alongside his brother Jeremiah, accused Lizzo of plagiarizing a line from his song "Healthy" and asked to receive songwriting credits. Instead, Lizzo filed a lawsuit in order to receive a declaratory judgment blocking the Raisens from receiving any songwriting credits. The Raisens responded in February 2020 by filing a counterclaim, asking to receive royalties and songwriting credits for the song.

Producer and songwriter discography

2022 

2021

2020

2019

2018

2017

2016

2015

2014

2013

2012

2011

References 

1982 births
Living people
Record producers from Florida
Songwriters from Florida